Andris Misters (born April 8, 1992) is a Latvian professional basketball player for CSM Ploiești of the  Liga Națională.  He plays as shooting guard.

Background 
Misters has represented the Latvian national team in four European youth championships.

Misters was once considered one of the top Latvian prospects for players born in 1992 and was invited to Fiva-Star Camp in Serbia in 2007. Overcame two major knee injuries (ACLs), first right after highschool, second before the college senior year, to pursue a professional basketball career. 

In August 2017, he went on a try-out for Latvian champions VEF Riga and later signed a contract.

References

External links
Andris Misters at fiba.com

1992 births
Living people
BK VEF Rīga players
Jacksonville Dolphins men's basketball players
Latvian expatriate basketball people in the United States
Latvian men's basketball players
People from Dobele
Shooting guards
Southeastern Oklahoma State Savage Storm men's basketball players
St. Benedict's Preparatory School alumni
Western Texas Westerners men's basketball players